Ventsislav Ivanov (born 7 September 1995) is a Bulgarian footballer who plays as a midfielder for CSKA 1948 II.

Career

Beroe Stara Zagora 
Ivanov bеgan his career in Beroe Stara Zagora. On 10 October 2013 he made his debut for the team in the Cup against Vidima Rakovski. On 4 May 2015 he made his professional debut in A Group for Beroe in a match against Chernomorets Burgas.

Vereya Stara Zagora 
For season 2015–16 he moved to B PFG sided FC Vereya and was released in June 2016.

Career statistics

Club

References

External links
 

Living people
1995 births
Bulgarian footballers
Association football midfielders
PFC Beroe Stara Zagora players
FC Vereya players
First Professional Football League (Bulgaria) players
Sportspeople from Stara Zagora